Donald L. Bitzer (born January 1, 1934) is an American electrical engineer and computer scientist. He was the co-inventor of the plasma display, is largely regarded as the "father of PLATO", and has made a career of improving classroom productivity by using computer and telecommunications technologies.

Education and career
He received three degrees in electrical engineering (B.S., 1955; M.S., 1956; Ph.D., 1960) from the University of Illinois at Urbana–Champaign. 

Bitzer holds several patents in numerous areas, while the creation of the PLATO computer system, the first system to combine graphics and touch-sensitive screens, is the hallmark of his efforts.

Bitzer co-invented the flat plasma display panel in 1964. Originally invented as an educational aid to help students working in front of computers for long periods of time, plasma screens do not flicker and are a significant advance in television technology. The display was also a way of overcoming the limited memory of the computer systems being used.

In 1974, Bitzer was elected as a member into the National Academy of Engineering for his leadership in the utilization and development of technology for improving the effectiveness of education.

, Bitzer was a Distinguished University Research Professor of Computer Science at North Carolina State University.

Awards
In 1973 the National Academy of Engineering presented Bitzer with the Vladimir K. Zworykin Award, which honors the inventor of the iconoscope. The invention won the Industrial Research 100 Award in 1966.

Bitzer is a designated National Associate, an honor which was granted to him by the National Academies in 2002. He is also a member of the American Society for Engineering Education.

Member of the National Academy of Engineering (1974)
Computer Society Fellow of the Institute of Electrical and Electronics Engineers (1982)
Slottow Creativity Award (1989)
Emmy Award (2002)
Inducted into National Inventors Hall of Fame (2013)
Fellow of the National Academy of Inventors (2018).
Holladay Medal (2019).

References

External links
NCSU Faculty Page
Oral history interview with Donald L. Bitzer, Charles Babbage Institute, University of Minnesota. Bitzer discusses his relationship with Control Data Corporation (CDC) during the development of PLATO, a computer-assisted instruction system. He describes the interest in PLATO of Harold Brooks, a CDC salesman and his help in procuring a 1604 computer for Bitzer's use. Bitzer recalls the commercialization of PLATO by CDC and his disagreements with CDC over marketing strategy and the creation of courseware for PLATO.
Oral history interview with Thomas Muir Gallie, Charles Babbage Institute, University of Minnesota. Gallie, a program officer at the National Science Foundation (NSF), describes the impact of Don Bitzer and the PLATO system.
University of Illinois Computer-based Education Research Laboratory PLATO Reports, PLATO Documents, and CERL Progress Reports, Charles Babbage Institute, University of Minnesota.  Archival collection contains internal reports and external reports and publications related to the development of PLATO and the operations of University of Illinois's CERL.

1934 births
Living people
20th-century American inventors
American electrical engineers
Grainger College of Engineering alumni
North Carolina State University faculty
Emmy Award winners
Computer-based Education Research Laboratory
People from Raleigh, North Carolina
Fellow Members of the IEEE